Echiochilon is a genus of flowering plants belonging to the family Boraginaceae.

Its native range is Northern Africa to Kenya and Southern Pakistan.

Species:

Echiochilon arabicum 
Echiochilon arenarium 
Echiochilon baricum 
Echiochilon callianthum 
Echiochilon chazaliei 
Echiochilon collenettei 
Echiochilon cyananthum 
Echiochilon fruticosum 
Echiochilon jugatum 
Echiochilon kotschyi 
Echiochilon lithospermoides 
Echiochilon longiflorum 
Echiochilon pauciflorum 
Echiochilon persicum 
Echiochilon pulvinatum 
Echiochilon simonneaui

References

Boraginoideae
Boraginaceae genera